Unión Balompédica Lebrijana is a Spanish football team based in Lebrija, in the autonomous community of Andalusia. Founded in 1928, it currently plays in Tercera División – Group 10, holding home matches at Estadio Municipal de Lebrija, with a 3,500-seat capacity.

Season to season

Old UB Lebrijana

New UB Lebrijana

6 seasons in Tercera División

References

External links
 
La Preferente team profile 

Football clubs in Andalusia
Association football clubs established in 1928
1928 establishments in Spain